Lasioacarus is a genus of mites in the family Acaridae.

Species
 Lasioacarus nidicolus Kadzhaya & Sevastyanov, 1967

References

Acaridae